Aaron Schoupp (born 29 June 2001) is an Australian professional rugby league footballer who plays as a  for the Gold Coast Titans in the NRL

Early life
Schoupp was born in Figtree, near Wollongong in New South Wales, Australia. He played junior rugby league for the Thirroul Butchers.

Playing career

2021
In round 11 of the 2021 NRL season, Schoupp made his first grade debut for Canterbury-Bankstown against the Gold Coast at Robina Stadium.
Schoupp made a total of 13 appearances for Canterbury in the 2021 NRL season as the club finished last and claimed the Wooden Spoon.

2022
In round 11 of the 2022 NRL season, Schoupp was sent to the sin bin for a dangerous tackle and later scored a try in Canterbury's 36-22 loss against the Wests Tigers.
Schoupp played a total of 19 matches for Canterbury in the 2022 NRL season as the club finished 12th on the table.
On 9 November, Schoupp was granted an immediate release from Canterbury to sign a three-year deal with the Gold Coast starting in 2023.

2023
In round 3 of the 2023 NRL season, Schoupp scored two tries for the Gold Coast in their 38-34 victory over Melbourne.

Controversy
On 25 June 2021, Schoupp was one of three Canterbury players who were ordered to self-isolate after attending a Covid-19 exposure site in Sydney's Eastern Suburbs.  The NRL had ordered players of all 16 teams a week earlier not to attend any restaurants, clubs or bars in the Waverley Local Government area.

References

External links
Canterbury Bulldogs profile

2001 births
Living people
Australian rugby league players
Canterbury-Bankstown Bulldogs players
Gold Coast Titans players
Rugby league centres
Rugby league players from Wollongong